Hartley Samuel Craig (19 September 1917 – 26 August 2007) is a former Australian cricketer, born in Prospect, Adelaide.

Craig played a number of minor matches in 1945 for the Royal Australian Air Force cricket team, but his only first-class appearance came at the end of that summer when he played for the Dominions against England at Lord's. Opening the batting he scored 56 and 32.

His brother Reginald had a rather longer first-class career, playing 31 times for South Australia.

References

External links
 

1917 births
2007 deaths
Australian cricketers
Dominions cricketers
Cricketers from Adelaide
Royal Australian Air Force personnel of World War II